Jean-François Buisson de Saint-Cosme (1667–1706) was a Canadian missionary, born in Quebec, ordained in 1690, and murdered while on a missionary trip.

Jean-François came from a family with a high level of devotion to the Catholic Church. His brother Michel became a priest, a sister Marie-Françoise was a nun of the Hôtel-Dieu, and an unidentified sister was a nun of the Congrégation de Notre-Dame. His parents administered a farm for the seminary of Quebec at Île Jésus. He was parish priest in Acadia from about 1692 until 1698 during the period of Joseph Robineau de Villebon and appears to have been less than successful in this pursuit.

Despite his lack of success in Acadia, Father St-Cosme become one of the pioneers of the missionary work by the Jesuits in the Mississippi Valley. By the end of 1704, he was alone in this work. He was murdered, with three French companions and a slave, while descending the Mississippi.

St. Cosme worked in the Grand Village of the Natchez which eventually led to him marrying the Great Sun's (King of the Natchez) sister - Tattooed Arm. In the Natchez culture, it is not the Great Sun's offspring who inherit the position it is the Great Sun's sister's offspring. Sometime around 1705 Tattooed Arm gave birth to St. Cosme's son who would be the last Great Sun before the French ultimately tried to eradicate the Natchez and sold St. Cosme's son, the Natchez King, into slavery in 1731.

In 1706, St. Cosme was encamped on the Mississippi River with several French companions. There they were attacked and killed by a band of Chitimacha warriors.

External links 

 the Catholic Encyclopedia
 Biography at the Dictionary of Canadian Biography Online
2009 Milne, George Edward. Picking up the Pieces: Natchez Coalescence in the Shatter Zone. In Mapping the Mississippian Shatter Zone edited by Robbie Ethridge and Sheri M. Shuck-Hall. pp. 388-417

Martyred Roman Catholic priests
1706 deaths
1667 births
French Jesuits
French Roman Catholic missionaries
Jesuit missionaries in New France
French murder victims